The Price of the Ticket is the third solo studio album by former Transvision Vamp lead singer Wendy James. Released in February 2016, it was written and produced by James, except for the final two tracks, which were cover versions of songs by Fred "Sonic" Smith and Bob Dylan.

Background
The album was recorded mainly in New York City, with the final two tracks being recorded in Berkeley, California to accommodate James Williamson. The album cover features a photograph of James topless, of which she stated "I don’t actually find it a particularly sexual shot in as much as you look at images of Rhianna or the way I was in the old days being flirtatious and provocative [...] Much more like an art or fashion photograph or sculpture or just a female anatomy as it is in other areas of creativity but not the music business." Some of the tracks contain autobiographical material, with "Screamin' Back Washington" a reference to James being adopted: "It's very honest. I was just imagining what it is like for any woman to … I’m thanking her for giving birth to me as opposed to having an abortion, but imagining how difficult it must be for any woman to give birth to a child and then give it away. Even if they are doing it for all the right reasons."

Track listing
All tracks are written by Wendy James, except where noted.

 "Paloma's Downs"
 "Indigent Blues"
 "King Rat"
 "Love from the 9th"
 "Bad Intentions and a Bit of Cruelty"
 "You're a Dirtbomb, Lester"
 "Screamin' Back Washington"
 "Why Oh Why Do You Hurt Me Still?"
 "Farewell to Love"
 "Cowboy Rhythm"
 "Situation Normal at Surfrider"
 "You're So Great" (Fred "Sonic" Smith)
 "It's Alright Ma" (Bob Dylan)

Personnel
Wendy James – vocals, rhythm guitar, keyboards, piano
Lenny Kaye – rhythm and lead guitar
Glen Matlock – bass
James Sclavunos – drums
James Williamson – guitar and bass (tracks 12 and 13)
Steve Mackay – baritone saxophone (track 13)

References

2016 albums
MCA Records albums
Wendy James albums